The Sea Change is a 1998 British-Spanish comedy film directed by Michael Bray and starring Maryam d'Abo, Sean Chapman and Ray Winstone. The screenplay concerns a workaholic British banker who neglects his girlfriend.

Premise
A workaholic British banker neglects his girlfriend. However, after his plane is delayed and he is forced to spend time in Barcelona he adopts a new life attitude.

Main cast
 Maryam d'Abo - Alison
 Sean Chapman - Rupert
 Ray Winstone - Chas
 Andrée Bernard - Sarah
 Germán Montaner - Mr. Caldeiro
 Amparo Moreno - Mrs. Caldeiro

References

External links

1998 films
British comedy films
Spanish comedy films
1998 comedy films
1990s English-language films
1990s British films
1990s Spanish films